More Than You Think You Are is the third studio album by American rock band Matchbox Twenty, released on November 19, 2002. The album is again a departure for the band as the album has more of a focus on harder rock than the band's two previous albums. Five singles were released from the album: "Disease", "Unwell", "Bright Lights", "Downfall", and "All I Need". "Downfall" was released only in the United States while "All I Need" was issued only in Australia.

Recording
Produced by the band's longtime studio collaborator Matt Serletic, More Than You Think You Are was recorded at Bearsville Studios in Woodstock, New York and at The Hit Factory in New York City.

Rob Thomas was pleased with the album, saying: "This is probably the most rockin' record we've ever done, because we've been working with Greg Collins, who's engineered bands like System of a Down and Red Hot Chili Peppers, and mixer Jim Scott, who's worked with people like Wilco and Tom Petty & the Heartbreakers. But at the same time, there's a warmness to the record, a real organic quality that I just love."

Release
The album debuted at number six on the Billboard 200 with 178,000 copies sold. Although not as commercially successful as the band's two earlier records, Yourself or Someone Like You and Mad Season, it had a large radio presence and produced three consecutive singles in the United States, all of them charting onto the top 30 of the Billboard Hot 100 chart. The album was nominated for Best Rock Album at the 2004 Grammy Awards, losing to the Foo Fighters' One by One. Following the album's release, the group took a hiatus to allow the members to focus on other projects, like Thomas's solo career. The following year, rhythm guitarist Adam Gaynor left the band in 2005.

Track listing

Personnel
Matchbox Twenty
Rob Thomas – lead vocals, piano on "Bright Lights"
Kyle Cook – lead guitar, backing vocals, piano on "Hand Me Down", banjo on "Unwell"
Adam Gaynor – rhythm guitar, backing vocals 
Brian Yale – bass guitar
Paul Doucette – drums and percussion on all tracks, Mellotron on "Hand Me Down" and "You're So Real", additional synthesizer on "All I Need", acoustic and electric guitar, piano and clavinet on "Could I Be You?"

Additional musicians
Matt Serletic – production, keyboards, congas on "Cold", backing vocals on "Soul"
David Campbell – string arrangements on "Bright Lights"
Greg Liesz – pedal steel guitar on "Bright Lights" and "Hand Me Down"
Bill Draheim – backing vocals on "Soul"
Melonie Daniels and Cheryl Pepsii Riley – backing vocals on "Feel"
Vaneese Thomas and Lydia Mann-Jaime – backing vocals on "Disease"
Erik Ralske and Jerome Ashby – French horns on "Unwell"
Carol Webb – violin and concert master on "Disease"
Rudy Michel – gospel choir contractor for "Downfall"
Jan Smith – vocal coach

Charts

Weekly charts

Year-end charts

Decade-end chart

Certifications

References

Matchbox Twenty albums
2002 albums
Atlantic Records albums
Albums produced by Matt Serletic